Luciano Luci (born August 2, 1949 in Campiglia Marittima). He is a retired football referee from Italy. He has refereed in the Serie A since 1985. His first match was played between A.C. Milan and S.S. Lazio on 12 May. Since then, he has refereed 105 matches in the Serie A (and 107 in Serie B). As an assistant referee he joined UEFA in the later 1980s in 25 international matches. He has also refereed one Coppa Italia final.

External links
Profile at footballdatabase.eu

Italian football referees
1949 births
Living people
Italian expatriate sportspeople in Ukraine